Yogesh Mathur (born 7 June 1969) is an Indian first-class cricketer who represented Rajasthan. He made his first-class debut for Rajasthan in the 1988-89 Ranji Trophy on 13 November 1988.

References

External links
 

1969 births
Living people
Indian cricketers
Rajasthan cricketers